Tea blending is the act of blending different teas together to produce a final product that differs in flavor from the original tea used. This occurs chiefly with black tea, which is blended to make most tea bags, but it can also occur with such teas as Pu-erh, where leaves are blended from different regions before being compressed. The most prominent type of tea blending is commercial tea blending, which is used to ensure consistency of a batch on a mass scale so that any variations between different batches and seasons of tea production do not affect the final product. However, it is also common to blend tea leaves with herbs and spice, either for health purposes or to add interesting and more complex flavor notes. It is important that any one blend must taste the same as the previous one, so a consumer will not be able to detect a difference in flavor from one purchase to the next.

Because tea takes on aromas with ease, there can be problems in the processing, transportation or storage of tea, but this property can also be used to prepare scented teas. Tea is often flavored in large blending drums with perfumes, flavorings, or essential oils. Although blending and scenting teas can add an additional dimension to tea, the process may also sometimes be used to cover and obscure the quality of sub-standard teas.

Varieties of blended tea
 Breakfast Breakfast teas are generally a blend of different robust, full-bodied black teas that are often drunk with milk. Common types of breakfast tea include English breakfast and Irish breakfast.
 Afternoon tea Afternoon blends of black teas are generally lighter than breakfast blends. Both breakfast and afternoon blends are popular in the British Isles; an example would be the Prince of Wales tea blend.
 Russian Caravan Russian Caravan is a popular blend that originates from the tea trade between Russia and China. It usually contains a bit of smoky lapsang souchong, though its base is typically Keemun or Dian Hong. Some variants also contain oolong.

Flavored and scented teas
Although many teas are still flavored directly with flowers, herbs, spices, or even smoke, teas with more specialized flavors are usually produced through the addition of flavorings or perfumes. This is particularly true for tea blends with pronounced fruit or flower aromas, which cannot be achieved with the original ingredients. Some firms such as Mariage Frères and Kusmi Tea have become quite famous for their perfumed teas. The most commonly used scents are jasmine, traditionally used to scent delicate white and green teas, and bergamot, which is used to scent Earl Grey tea. The teas described below are flavored directly with other materials.

Flowers

A variety of flowers are used to flavor teas. Although flowers can be used to scent teas directly, most flower-scented teas on the market use perfumes and aromas to augment or replace the use of flowers. The most popular flower teas include the following:

Jasmine: Tea can be spread with jasmine flowers while oxidizing to give it a floral flavor; occasionally some are left in the tea as a decoration. Jasmine is most commonly used to flavor green teas to produce jasmine tea, although sometimes it is used to flavor light oolong teas such as baozhong tea.
Osmanthus: In China, osmanthus tea (called) is produced by combining dried sweet osmanthus (Osmanthus fragrans) flowers with black or green tea leaves in much the same manner as jasmine tea is flavored. The flower gives the tea a mild peachy flavor. It is the second most popular scented tea in China, after jasmine.

Rose: Similar to jasmine, tea can be spread with rose flowers while oxidizing. Rose petals can also be left in the tea as a decoration. In China, roses are usually used to scent black tea; the resulting tea is called rose .
Chrysanthemum: The flowers are often brewed alone to create a chrysanthemum tisane, but they are also commonly mixed with pu-erh tea to make chrysanthemum pu-erh.
Lotus: Vietnamese lotus tea is made by stuffing green tea leaves into the blossom of Nelumbo nucifera and allowing the scent to be absorbed overnight. Another common technique for making this tea is by jarring or baking the tea leaves with the fragrant stamens of the flower multiple times.
Orchid: The most commonly used orchid species in tea is vanilla.

Herbs 
Mint: Maghrebi mint tea, or Moroccan mint tea, consists of a mixture of green teas and any variety of the mint plants (known as nana), and is popular in the Middle East and desert areas of North Africa. Mint can also be brewed on its own to create a mint herbal tea.
Pandan: Pandan, also known as screwpine, is a popular additive to green or black tea in Malaysia, Indonesia, and the Philippines.

Other flavorings
Citrus peel: The best known citrus-flavored tea is Earl Grey, which is made by infusing black teas with bergamot peel. More typically, however, an essential oil or perfume blend of the citrus fruit is used. Lady Grey differs from Earl Grey in that it contains additional lemon peel and orange peel.
Rum: Jagertee is a tea with rum added.
Roasted grain: Genmaicha is a popular Japanese green tea with roasted rice added. Wheat and barley are also used to blend with tea.
Smoke: One type in this class is lapsang souchong, which is produced by drying black tea over smoking pine needles. This process gives it a striking smoky odor and flavor. The best varieties are not overwhelmed by the smoke, but retain subtlety and a mix of other flavors. Lapsang souchong is found in many Russian Caravan blends.
Spice: Tea such as Indian and Middle Eastern masala chai are flavored with sweet spices such as ginger, cardamom, cinnamon, cassia, black pepper, clove, anise, fennel, Indian bay leaf and sometimes vanilla, nutmeg and mace. See also Kahwah.

See also

ISO 3103
Tea leaf grading

References

 Rec.food.drink.tea FAQ